Cecilia Victoria Oreña-Drilon (born July 8, 1961), simply known as Ces Drilon, is a Filipino broadcast journalist. She presented news and public affairs programs for the News and Current Affairs division of ABS-CBN Broadcasting Corporation from 1989 to 2020. She is currently the host of the nationally syndicated afternoon public service program Basta Promdi, Lodi via RMN-DZXL in Metro Manila and in key cities in the Philippines.

Personal life
Ces Oreña-Drilon is married to painter Rock Drilon, a nephew of Senator Franklin Drilon. They have four children. She graduated from the University of the Philippines Diliman with a Bachelor of Arts degree in communication research.

Kidnapping incident
In June 2008, Oreña-Drilon and news cameramen Jimmy Encarnacion and Angelo Valderrama were abducted in Maimbung, Sulu, Jolo, by al-Qaeda-linked Abu Sayyaf militants. She was held for ransom for nine days.
 
Oreña-Drilon's team was invited by Professor Octavio Dinampo, an academic at the Mindanao State University, Sulu. Dinampo, a Muslim, was also missing. The militants were led by Albader Parad, an Abu Sayyaf leader and Gapur Jundain, former member of the Moro National Liberation Front.
 
Chief Superintendent Joel Goltiao, police regional director for the Autonomous Region in Muslim Mindanao, announced that: "Pinapakain naman sila (They are being fed well), they are well and alive, hindi sila nakatali (they are not tied) and nakakalabas sila (they are able to move around) but they are being escorted." Ransom was allegedly demanded, ranging from ₱10 million to ₱30 million (US$410,000 and US$630,000). Oreña-Drilon was the third local journalist to be kidnapped by Abu Sayyaf after 2000. A documentary on Drilon's kidnapping was aired on ABS-CBN on July 13, 2008.

Release and deadline
The militants released Valderama on June 12, after a ransom payment of ₱100,000 pesos (US$2,250). Negotiator Isnaji Alvarez stated that the abductors gave Drilon's family until June 17 to pay US$1.12 million, but a deadline for the other two hostages was unclear. Xinhua, reported that the “militants had set a deadline of Tuesday noon for a ransom of ₱15 million pesos (US$337,079), local media reported Monday.” Isnaji earlier said “the abductors demanded 20 million pesos (US$450,000) in ransom.” Minutes before the deadline, the kidnappers extended "Indefinitely" the deadline for the release of Drilon and her companions, with the abductors requesting livelihood products in exchange for their freedom.
 
Oreña-Drilon and her companions were released on June 17, 2008, following negotiations with Philippine security officials. Oreña-Drilon, Jimmy Encarnacion and Octavio Dinampo were picked up in Talipao, Indanan, Sulu, by Mayor Alvarez Isnaji at about midnight.
 
After eating noodles for 9 days, surrounded by more than 20 abductors, Oreña-Drilon and her crew met Grechie and Frank Oreña, Drilon's siblings, with Loren Legarda and Maria Ressa on June 18, in Zamboanga City, at the La Vista del Mar Beach Resort. They arrived at Ninoy Aquino International Airport from Zamboanga City around 2pm, for a short press conference and underwent a medical checkup at Medical City Hospital in Pasig.
 
Senator Loren Legarda, a negotiator, said the refusal of ABS-CBN and the government to pay a ransom, and the deployment of troops around Indanan, prompted the release. Al Jazeera's reporter, Veronica Pedrosa, stated "a military offensive near the kidnappers' camp had apparently helped free the hostages." Oreña-Drilon stated that she was betrayed by someone who delivered her to the kidnappers and the Abu Sayyaf militants threatened to behead them: "We came close to losing our lives; There was some betrayal involved and that is why we were kidnapped; I thought I was so reckless. I didn't think of my family who I put through a really terrible ordeal in the past 10 days. I would like to thank everybody - words are not enough to thank those who prayed for the professor, and Jimmy and Angel and myself. I put the lives of my team in danger so it was really a very sobering experience to me.” AFP reported that ransom was paid "following talks between the Abu Sayyaf and Senator Loren Legarda, who is expected to contest the 2010 presidential election." The Canadian Press stated that "There were speculations that as much as $337,000 in ransom was paid for their release. Drilon condemned the abductors, who tied them and slapped her during the dire detention." AHN, however, reported that the release was made in exchange for livelihood assistance instead of a ransom. Philippine National Police Chief Avelino Razon stated: "Sabi niya pasensya na General, pati ikaw ay nadamay. Sabi ko trabaho lang ito, kami talagang tutulong para sa inyong pagbalik (She told me, General I'm sorry you were dragged into this. I told her, it's not a problem, it's our job to ensure your safe return)."

Arrest and investigation
Octavio Dinampo, on June 20, stated that Mayor Alvarez Isnaji, alias "Larin-Larin," pocketed much of the "first" ransom of ₱5 million (US$112,500). Isnaji's lawyer, Ernesto Francisco, however, said his client was innocent and prosecuted for political reasons: "If you examine the background of Mayor Isnaji, there is no instance in the past that he was involved in any criminal activity." Raul M. Gonzalez said "Isnaji was a highly respected politician in Jolo who plans to run for governor of the Muslim autonomous region, which includes the island, in August." Gonzalez and PNP Director General Avelino Razon Jr. affirmed that Isnaji "kept to himself ₱3 million (US$67,568) and paid the kidnappers ₱2 million (US$45,045) (from the Drilon family)." Razon, Jr. showed pictures of Isnaji, his son, Haider, and Sulu Vice-Governor Lady Ann Sahidulla gathered around the ₱5 million ransom, with Senior Superintendent Willy Quidato. Meanwhile, Dinampo and Sulu provincial police director Senior Superintendent Julasirim Kasim said that guide Juamil "Mameng" Biyaw betrayed the ABS-CBN team.
 
The Criminal Investigation and Detection Group (CIDG) filed the complaint before the Department of Justice on June 20, against Isnaji, his son Haider and 14 Abu Sayyaf members, for the kidnapping. Ces Drilon, Jimmy Encarnacion and Angel Valderama personally signed the complaint. The pre-trial conference was set for 1pm on Monday. They are currently detained at the PNP headquarters. Razon, Jr. implicated at least 3 relatives of Isnaji: "Three of the suspects are relatives of the mayor, di natin alam sino yan (At least three of the suspects are relatives of the mayor but we have not identified them by name)." Also, Razon affirmed inquiry into a supposed 2nd payoff / ransom concerning 2 duffel bags flown into Sulu via a South East Asian Airlines (SEAIR) flight hours before the hostages' release. DILG Secretary Ronaldo Puno also said that Isnaji (and his son) may have masterminded the abduction: "The kidnappers themselves were double-crossed."
 
On October 11, 2008, Al-Qaeda members linked ASG Asma Awang, Makambian Sakilan, and Tagayan Sakilan, all from Talipao, Sulu, including Marcial Totoh Jabarot, alias Abu Cesar, were arrested by the Sixth Marine Battalion Landing Team in Jolo. Also, suspect Adjili Sakilan was killed and 4 fled. Meanwhile, the Sulu Philippine National Police and Task Force Comet announced probe of Asma Awang and relatives Makambian Sakilan and Tagayan Sakilan in Drilon's abduction. Further, Lt. Colonel Ernesto Torres Jr said Devaro was an Abu Sayyaf member from 2000 under Kumander Tahil Salih.

Controversy
A documentary on Drilon's kidnapping was made and aired by ABS-CBN on July 13, 2011. However, the Department of Justice per government prosecutors warned ABS-CBN against airing any video footage, alleging that it would affect the pending investigation's outcome.

Penalty of suspension
ABS-CBN, on July 5, 2008, punished Ces Oreña-Drilon with 3 months suspension as news anchor of Bandila and as Senior Correspondent, for disobeying orders not to go to Indanan, Sulu (violation of Standards & Ethics Manual). Earlier, Ces apologized "for unwittingly endangering lives." Maria Ressa noted the “grave consequences of her error in judgment.” On October 6, 2008, Oreña-Drilon returned as co-anchor of “Bandila” after the suspension's lapse. She announced the airing of a segment on the physical and psychological effects of the Mindanao conflict on Armed Forces of the Philippines's soldiers.

Career
Ces Oreña-Drilon began her television career in 1985 when she joined the Maharlika Broadcasting System (now People's Television Network) as a news reporter. Her reporting on the capture of Army renegade Col. Gregorio Honasan caught the attention of ABS-CBN Network, which hired her in 1989 to cover the Philippine Senate. She appeared regularly on The World Tonight as the program's business correspondent.

Together with Cathy Yap-Yang, she hosted Usapang Business, a weekly business-oriented show which was soon cancelled due to budget cuts. She later presented several news and current affairs programs for ABS-CBN and for the ABS-CBN News Channel, including Pipol and The Correspondents. Since the 2000s, Oreña-Drilon has served as a co-anchor of the ABS-CBN late-night news program Bandila, and as an alternate anchor for TV Patrol.

In 2007, Ces Oreña-Drilon was among several Filipino journalists covering the Manila Peninsula rebellion who were briefly detained by the Philippine military, shortly after the mutiny was quashed.

In June 2008, she along with her companions were kidnapped by the Abu Sayyaf in Sulu but were later released.

In July 2020, Oreña-Drilon was retrenched by ABS-CBN as the network was shut down by both the National Telecommunications Commission and Office of the Solicitor General last May due to an expired franchise and Congress rejected its fresh 25-year franchise. She returned to farming.

In 2021, Oreña-Drilon would later join Radio Mindanao Network-DZXL, wherein she is the host of afternoon public service program Basta Promdi, Lodi.

In December 2022, Oreña-Drilon joined CNN Philippines, where she would host Usapang Bilyonaryo. This marks her return to television more two years after being retrenched by ABS-CBN.

References

External links
Kidnap Charges Laid Against Mayor Isnaji and Son
Ces Drilon at Telebisyon.net

ABS-CBN News and Current Affairs people
1961 births
Filipino television news anchors
Living people
People from Baguio
University of the Philippines Diliman alumni